Kabaddi was contested by six teams at the 1998 Asian Games in Srinakharinwirot University, Bangkok, Thailand from December 13 to December 16.

India won the gold medal in a round robin competition by winning all six matches. Pakistan finished second and won the silver medal while Bangladesh finished in bronze medal position.

Schedule

Medalists

Results

Final standing

References
Results

 
1998 Asian Games events
1998
Asian Games
1998 Asian Games